Halothamnus somalensis is a species of the plant genus Halothamnus, that is now included into the family Amaranthaceae, (formerly Chenopodiaceae). It is endemic to the Horn of Africa (Djibouti, Somalia, and Ethiopia) and is used for traditional medicine.

Description 
Halothamnus somalensis is a thorny shrub 30–90 cm high, with olive-green branches, that partly turn black when drying. The semiterete, tiny leaves are appressed to the branches,  and only 0,5–3 mm long. The flowers are 3,0-4,7 mm long. The winged fruit is 8-12,5 mm in diameter, their wings never turning black even on blackened plants. The bottom of the fruit tube has very small linear grooves located near the periphery, lacking any prominent radial veins.

Anatomy 
Halothamnus somalensis has epidermis walls with an outer cutinized layer in addition to the cuticle itself. It is the only species of the genus that shows this anatomical feature.

Taxonomy 
The species has been first described in 1909 by Nicholas Edward Brown as Salsola somalensis (In: Bull. Misc. Inform. 2, 1909, p. 50). In 1981, Victor Petrovič Botschantzev included it into the genus Halothamnus. The species has sometimes been misidentified as Halothamnus bottae, occurring on the Arabian peninsula.

Distribution 
Halothamnus somalensis is endemic in Djibouti, Somalia and dry areas of Ethiopia.  Similar plants from the Arabian peninsula belong to  Halothamnus bottae ssp. niger. It grows in open thorny savanna on sandy, clayey or rocky ground, from 0–1750 m above sea level.

Uses 
The roots of Halothamnus somalensis are traditionally used as a medicine plant against parasitic worm diseases in animals or humans.

Vernacular names 
In Somalia, the species is known as "gosomadowbeye" ("gowsa-madobeyi", "goso-mudo-weyi", "gusomadobeye", "gosama do beya") This name derives from the Somalian words goso (= molar teeth) and madow (= black), referring to the fact, that the teeth and lips are stained black when the plant is eaten. Other commons names are "afmadobeye", "dankup", "mirrow", "mimou", or "mirgi-edalis". 
In Djibouti, the species is called "Yagali".

References 
 Gabriele Kothe-Heinrich: Revision der Gattung Halothamnus (Chenopodiaceae). Bibliotheca Botanica Bd. 143, Schweizerbart, Stuttgart 1993, p. 49-53 Bibliotheca Botanica Bd. 143

External links 

 Halothamnus somalensis with distribution map, at African Plant Database

somalensis
Taxa named by Victor Botchantsev
Taxa named by N. E. Brown